Dippolito may refer to:

Dalia Dippolito, American criminal
Joseph Dippolito (1914–1974), Italian American Mafia member